Punggye-ri Nuclear Test Site was the only known nuclear test site of North Korea.  Nuclear tests were conducted at the site in October 2006, May 2009, February 2013, January 2016, September 2016, and September 2017.

Geography 
The site was established in the early 2000s and has three visible tunnel entrances.

History 
In January 2013, Google Maps was updated to include various locations in North Korea. On 8 April 2013, it was reported that South Korea had observed activity at Punggye-ri, suggesting that a fourth nuclear test was being prepared, but the next test did not occur until January 2016.

On 6 January 2016, North Korean state media announced a fourth nuclear test had been carried out successfully at the location using a hydrogen bomb.  Satellite imagery captured for monitoring website 38 North between January and April 2017 suggested that a sixth nuclear test was being prepared at the site, which was detonated on 3 September 2017. 

According to sources, people from the Punggye-ri nuclear test site have been banned from entering Pyongyang since the test due to the possibility of being radioactively contaminated. According to the report of defectors, about 80% of trees died and all of the underground wells dried up in the site after the sixth nuclear test.

On 3 and 23 September 2017, earthquakes which seem to be collapses of tunnels were detected with magnitude of 4.1 and 3.6 respectively.  A 17 October 2017 study published by the US-Korea Institute at Johns Hopkins University suggested the most recent test had caused "substantial damage to the existing tunnel network under Mount Mantap".

On 30 October 2017, in testimony before the South Korean parliament, the director of South Korea's Meteorological Administration warned that "further tests at Punggye-ri could cause the mountain to collapse and release radioactivity into the environment." Likewise, Chinese scientists warned that if the mountain collapsed, nuclear fallout could spread across "an entire hemisphere."

On 1 November 2017 Japanese TV station TV Asahi reported that according to unconfirmed reports, several tunnels collapsed at the test site on 10 October 2017.  An initial collapse was said to have killed 100 workers, with another 100 rescuers killed in a second collapse.

On 20 April 2018 the North Korean government announced that it would suspend nuclear tests and shut down the Punggye-ri nuclear test site.

On 14 May 2018 it was reported that commercial satellite imagery indicated that dismantling of the facilities at the test site had begun. The leader and Supreme Commander of North Korea Kim Jong-un determined the date for the closing ceremony of Punggye-ri - 23-25 May 2018. The government of North Korea allowed a handful of international journalists (but none from South Korea) to observe the closing ceremony. Notably absent would be experts or inspectors who could study the test site at close quarters.

On 24 May 2018 foreign journalists reported that tunnels in the Punggye-ri nuclear test site had been destroyed by the North Korean government in a move to reduce regional tensions.

However, despite the active tunnel entrances being demolished, the tunnels themselves were not destroyed and the tunnels that were never used in testing were not part of the public demolition. Additionally, the majority of the administrative and support facilities along Punggye-ri's 17-km-long complex were not demolished, and caretaker activities have been noted as recently as 25 November 2020.

David Albright of the Institute for Science and International Security noted:

Observers noted that the site was rehabilitated in early 2022 for possible nuclear cruise missile warhead tests later in the year. The United States, Korea and Japan stated on October 26, 2022 that North Korea would receive an "overwhelming, decisive" and "unparalleled" response from the three nations if testing was renewed.

International observations 
On 31 October 2018, Kim Min-ki, a lawmaker in South Korea's ruling Democratic Party, stated that now defunct Punggye-ri was among other nuclear and missile test sites which had been observed by officials from South Korea's National Intelligence Service and that it was now ready for planned international inspection.

References 

North Korean nuclear test sites
Nuclear program of North Korea
Nuclear accidents and incidents
Disasters in North Korea
Tunnel disasters
Geography of North Hamgyong
Military installations established in 2006
Military installations closed in 2018
Buildings and structures demolished in 2018
2006 establishments in North Korea
2018 disestablishments in North Korea